Quakake is an unincorporated community located in Rush Township, Schuylkill County, Pennsylvania, United States. 
The community is in Area Code 570, served by the 467 exchange.

Quakake is a Native American name purported to mean "pine lands".

References

Unincorporated communities in Schuylkill County, Pennsylvania
Unincorporated communities in Pennsylvania
Pennsylvania placenames of Native American origin